A Romance of the Redwoods is a 1917 American silent drama film directed by Cecil B. DeMille and starring Mary Pickford. A print of the film survives in the film archive at George Eastman House.

Cast
 Mary Pickford as Jenny Lawrence
 Elliott Dexter as "Black" Brown, Road Agent
 Tully Marshall as Sam Sparks
 Raymond Hatton as Dick Roland
 Charles Ogle as Jim Lyn
 Walter Long as Sheriff
 Winter Hall as John Lawrence, Uncle To Jenny

Production
Mary Pickford was paid $90,000.

See also
 Mary Pickford filmography

References

External links

 
 
 

1917 films
1917 drama films
Silent American drama films
American silent feature films
American black-and-white films
Films directed by Cecil B. DeMille
Films set in the 1850s
Articles containing video clips
Paramount Pictures films
1910s American films
1910s English-language films
English-language drama films